Poľany is a village and municipality in the Trebišov District in the Košice Region of south-eastern Slovakia.

History
In historical records the village was first mentioned in 1214.

Geography
The village lies at an altitude of 103 metres and covers an area of 18.505 km².
It has a population of about 535 people.

Ethnicity
The village is about 83% Hungarian and 17% Slovak.

Facilities
The village has a public library and a football pitch.

External links
http://www.statistics.sk/mosmis/eng/run.html

Villages and municipalities in Trebišov District
Zemplín (region)